Espanola is an unincorporated community in Flagler County, Florida, United States. It is located at the intersection of Old Brick Road, County Road 13, and County Road 205. It is part of the Deltona–Daytona Beach–Ormond Beach, FL metropolitan statistical area.

Geography

References

Unincorporated communities in Flagler County, Florida
Unincorporated communities in Florida